The Sound Explosion is a Greek garage rock revival band formed in 1991 in Athens, Greece. Its line up is John Alexopoulos (vocals, 6 and 12 string Vox guitar, harmonica), Dimitrios Dimopoulos (Bass guitar, backing vocals), Stelios Askoxylakis (Farfisa organ,  backing vocals) and Stavros Daktylas (drums, tambourine). The band has played several concerts in Greece with bands like The Fuzztones, Dead Moon, Sick Rose, Cynics, the Others The Marshmallow Overcoat and co and in Beat Festival in Italy 2005. It split up in 1997, but reunited during the early 2000s .
In the end of 2017 they started to record a new 14 song album after 24 years with general title The explosive sounds of...The Sound Explosion and it will be released in April 2018 in the label Lost in tyme records

Discography

Albums

Teen Trash Volume 14: From Athens, Greece  (LP/CD)(Music Maniac Records) (1994)
The  Explosive Sounds Of the Sound Explosion  (LP/CD) (Lost In Tyme)     (2018)

Singles and EPs

Hangover Baby / Some Other Guy (Pegasus Records) (1993)
I'll Shake The Universe / Why Can't You See (Dionysus Records) (1994)
Another Lie / Misirlou The Greek (Studio II) (1995)
The Last Recordings EP (Το Δισκάδικο) (2000)
The Sound Explosion / The Basements  - Split (Lost In Tyme)	2013	

Greek musical groups
Musical groups from Athens